The Pinacoteca Tosio Martinengo is a public art museum in Brescia, Lombardy.

Established in 1851, the museum exhibits mainly paintings by local artists dated from the Thirteenth through the Eighteenth century. The museum's current collection includes over 800 works of painting and sculpture, displayed in 21 galleries.

The museum reopened on 17 March 2018 after a major nine-year-long renovation project.

History
The gallery opened in 1851 in the central Palazzo Tosio, endowed in 1832 with the collection of Count Paolo Tosio and further enriched by donations and gathering of items from local religious buildings.

In 1884, the Count Leopardo Martinengo da Barco added to the painting collection and endowed a library and collections of scientific artifacts to display in his palace.

Museum 
The current collection of the museum includes works by Vincenzo Foppa, Ferramola, Paolo Veneziano, Andrea Solari, Francesco Francia, Lorenzo Lotto, Luca Mombello and Lattanzio Gambara.

Collection highlights

Paintings

References

External links

 

 
1832 establishments in Italy

Art museums established in 1851
Collections of museums in Italy
1851 establishments in Italy